Jalan Gasing is a major road in Petaling Jaya city, Selangor, Malaysia. It is the first dual-carriageway road built in Malaysia since independence. It also has the most number or churches in a single street in Malaysia.

Landmarks
SMK(P)Taman Petaling
EPF headquarters
Catholic High School
St. Francis Xavier's Church
Church
Taman Jaya
Wat Chetawan Buddhist temple
La Salle Primary School
La Salle Secondary School
Bukit Gasing
Bulatan Templer roundabout

List of junctions

References
Roads and Railways, Chapter 4: Infrastructures and Communications, Encyclopedia of Malaysia: The Economy (Volume Editor: Prof. Dr H. Osman Rani)

Roads in Petaling Jaya